Albert Cook may refer to:

Albert Cook (footballer) (1880–1949), soccer player
Albert John Cook (1842–1916), American entomologist and zoologist
Sir Albert Ruskin Cook (1870–1951), British missionary in Uganda
Albert Spaulding Cook (1925–1998), American comparative literature scholar and poet
Albert Stanburrough Cook (1853–1927), American Old English philologist and academic

See also
Bert Cook (disambiguation)